Mets, METS or The Mets can refer to:

In sports

Baseball teams

Active teams
 New York Mets, a major league baseball team in New York City
 Binghamton Mets, Binghamton, New York
 Columbia Mets, Columbia, South Carolina
 DSL Mets, which plays in the Dominican Summer League
 London Mets, London, United Kingdom
 Moncton Mets, Moncton, New Brunswick, Canada
 Kingsport Mets, Kingsport, Tennessee
 St. Lucie Mets, Port St. Lucie, Florida
 Syracuse Mets, Syracuse, New York

Former teams
 New York Metropolitans, New York City
 Auburn Mets, Auburn, New York
 Jackson Mets, Jackson, Mississippi
 Greenville Mets, Greenville, South Carolina
 Little Falls Mets, Little Falls, New York
 Marion Mets, Marion, Virginia
 Meridian Mets, Meridian, Mississippi
 Pittsfield Mets, Little Falls, New York
 Wausau Mets, Wausau, Wisconsin
 Williamsport Mets, Williamsport, Pennsylvania
 Winter Haven Mets, Winter Haven, Florida

Other sports
 Glasgow Mets, a volleyball team in Glasgow, United Kingdom
 Mets de Guaynabo (basketball), a basketball team in Guaynabo, Puerto Rico
 Mets de Guaynabo (volleyball), a volleyball team in Guaynabo, Puerto Rico

Acronym or abbreviation
 Math, engineering, technology, and science, an acronym replaced by science, technology, engineering, and mathematics (STEM)
 Metadata Encoding and Transmission Standard
 Metabolic equivalent (MET, often in plural as METS), a measure of exercise intensity
 Metabolic syndrome
 Metastasis, the spread of a disease from one organ or part to another non-adjacent organ or part
 Metropolitan Evansville Transit System

Other uses
 Mets (surname), a surname of Estonian origin
 Mets, Greece, a neighbourhood of Athens

See also
 Metz (disambiguation)
 Met (disambiguation)